Crithe nipponica is a species of very small sea snail, a marine gastropod mollusk or micromollusk in the family Cystiscidae. They can grow to 1.5 mm in length, and are located in the benthic zone. Geographically, they can be found in the Philippine Sea.

References

External links
 Coovert G.A. & Coovert H.K. (1995) Revision of the supraspecific classification of marginelliform gastropods. The Nautilus 109(2-3): 43-110

Cystiscidae
Gastropods described in 1951
Nipponica